Hemiaulax is a genus of beetles in the family Carabidae, containing the following species:

 Hemiaulax dentipennis (Bates, 1892)
 Hemiaulax himalayensis (Dellabeffa, 1931)

References

Harpalinae